Sheila Watt (born 27 January 1941) is a retired British and Scottish butterfly swimmer.
Sheila Watt died on the 10th of March 2023 in hospital

Swimming career
She competed at the 1960 Summer Olympics in the individual 100 m butterfly and 4 × 100 m medley relay and finished in fourth and fifth place, respectively. She competed for Scotland at the British Empire and Commonwealth Games in 1958 and 1962.

Swimming for the Thistle Club she won the ASA National British Championships in 1958, 1959 and 1960, competing in the 100 metres butterfly competition.

References

1941 births
Living people
British female swimmers
Scottish female swimmers
Olympic swimmers of Great Britain
Swimmers at the 1960 Summer Olympics
Commonwealth Games competitors for Scotland
Swimmers at the 1958 British Empire and Commonwealth Games
Swimmers at the 1962 British Empire and Commonwealth Games
Female butterfly swimmers
People from East Godavari district